Diss railway station is on the Great Eastern Main Line in the East of England, serving the town of Diss, Norfolk. Its three-letter station code is DIS.

The station is currently operated by Greater Anglia, who also operate all trains serving it, as part of the East Anglia franchise.

Due to its location, Diss is the only station on the Greater Anglia network (and, by extension, one of the only stations in the UK) to be served exclusively by inter-city trains.

History

The station at Diss was proposed by the Ipswich & Bury Railway, as part of their route to Norwich. Such were the changes in the railway industry that, in 1847, the Ipswich & Bury Railway became part of the Eastern Union Railway, which started operating in 1849. This became part of the Eastern Counties Railway (ECR) in 1854, which amalgamated with several other companies in 1862 to form the Great Eastern Railway (GER).
 
In 1873, there was an incident at Diss when a goods train a and passenger train collided in foggy conditions, injuring four passengers.

In 1883, a signal box was opened, possibly replacing an earlier structure.

From July 1898 to December 1915 the station master was Robert Gillingwater (1854-1923). He became a well respected figure in the town and had a staff consisting of:

 7 x clerks
 2 x signalman
 2 x motor drivers
 2 x horse shunters
 2 x station foreman
 An unknown number of passenger and goods porters

During the early part of the century the goods yard was extended twice and during World War I an Army Service Corps depot was established adjacent to the station.

Following the 1921 grouping, the GER amalgamated with other railways to form the London and North Eastern Railway (LNER).

On nationalisation in 1948, the station and its services came under the management of the Eastern Region of British Railways.

Some goods shunting at Diss was carried out by horses as late as 1959.

In 1985, the line through Diss was electrified by British Rail to the 25 kV overhead system and, the following year, electrically hauled InterCity services commenced. At the same time, the signal box was closed as power-signalling was introduced to the area.

Following the privatisation of British Rail, the ownership of the tracks and station passed to Railtrack until 2002 and then to its successor Network Rail. During this period, the operation of the station and train services has been franchised to Anglia Railways (1997-2004), then to National Express East Anglia (2004-2012) and currently Abellio Greater Anglia (since 2012).

Description
A goods yard was located on the 'up' (eastern) side of the line equipped with a shed for the loading and unloading of goods, as well as cattle pens. Until the 1880s, the Scole Estate Railway (an agricultural railway for William Betts' family at Frenze Hall, which extended for seven miles and had two engines) had a connection into the station yard.

As of 2013, the station has a waiting room on each platform and toilets on the up side (platform 1). It has a ticket office and ticket machines, one located on each platform. The old station master's house, which is part of the station and mostly the station's upstairs accommodation, is currently being used by one of the town's taxi companies.

Services

Services at Diss are operated by Abellio Greater Anglia between London Liverpool Street and  every 30 minutes in each direction.

This local service was withdrawn in 1966 when the smaller stations were closed.

References

 

Railway stations in Norfolk
DfT Category C2 stations
Former Great Eastern Railway stations
Railway stations in Great Britain opened in 1849
Greater Anglia franchise railway stations
1849 establishments in England
Diss, Norfolk